Jan Balstad (born 16 November 1937 in Oslo) is a Norwegian labour leader for the Norwegian Confederation of Trade Unions, and a politician for the Labour Party. He was Minister of trade and shipping affairs at the Ministry of Foreign Affairs 1988–1989.

References

External links
Biography
Interview 

1937 births
Living people
Labour Party (Norway) politicians
Ministers of Trade and Shipping of Norway